Major General Sam Kavuma, whose full name is Samuel Kavuma, is a Ugandan senior military officer. He currently serves as the deputy coordinator of the Operation Wealth Creation effective 24 June 2021, he was appointed  by Yoweri Kaguta Museveni. Immediately prior to his current position, he served as the deputy commander of the Uganda People's Defence Force Air Force. Before that, Kavuma served as the Commander of the Uganda People's Defence Force Contingent in Somalia, as part of the African Union Mission to Somalia. He was appointed to that position in October 2014. He replaced Brigadier Dick Olum, who served in that position from September 2013 until October 2014.

Background and education
Sam Kavuma was born in Central Uganda, circa 1960. He received military training from the National Defence College, Kenya, between July 2012 until June 2013.

Military career
In 2011, at the rank of colonel, Sam Kavuma was the Commanding Officer of the Uganda People's Defence Force 5th Division, based in Pader, Northern Uganda. On 18 September 2011, he was promoted to the rank of brigadier. In July 2013, having recently graduated from the National Defence College, Kenya, Brigadier Kavuma was appointed as "Commander of the Regional Taskforce against the LRA in South Sudan and Central African Republic (CAR)", replacing Bigadier Dick Olum. In October 2014, Yoweri Museveni, the Commander in Chief of the Uganda People's Defence Force, appointed Brigadier Sam Kavuma, as overall Commander of their contingent to the African Union Mission to Somalia.

Other considerations
Major General Samuel Kavuma serves as the Chairman of Wazalendo Savings and Credit Cooperative Society, a savings and credit cooperative belonging to the members of the Ugandan military.

See also
 Dick Olum
 David Muhoozi
 Leopold Kyanda
 Katumba Wamala

References

External links

 Official AMISOM Webpage
 Brigadier Kavuma Takes Command of Ugandan AMISOM Troops

Living people
Ganda people
1960 births
Ugandan generals